Heinrich Band (1821 – 1860) was the inventor of the bandoneón; this 'hand-organ-like' instrument is a reed instrument in the concertina family of instruments.

References

Inventors of musical instruments
People from Krefeld
1821 births
1860 deaths